Carex qingliangensis is a species of sedge found on mountain slopes at an elevation of  in Zhejiang province in eastern China.

References

qingliangensis
Flora of China
Plants described in 2009